The Sahara desert, as defined by the World Wide Fund for Nature (WWF), includes the hyper-arid center of the Sahara, between latitudes 18° N and 30° N. It is one of several desert and xeric shrubland ecoregions that cover the northern portion of the African continent.

Setting
The Sahara Desert is the world's largest hot, non-polar desert and is located in North Africa. It stretches from the Red Sea to the Atlantic Ocean. The vast desert encompasses several ecologically distinct regions.

The North Saharan steppe and woodlands ecoregion lies to the north and west, bordering the Mediterranean climate regions of Africa's Mediterranean and North Atlantic coasts. The North Saharan steppe and woodlands receives more regular winter rainfall than the Sahara Desert ecoregion. The South Saharan steppe and woodlands ecoregion lies to the south, between the Sahara Desert ecoregion and the Sahel grasslands. The South Saharan steppe and woodlands receive most of its annual rainfall during the summer. The Red Sea coastal desert lies in the coastal strip between the Sahara Desert ecoregion and the Red Sea.  The western portion of the region is known as El Djouf, on the border of Mauritania and Mali.

Some mountain ranges rise up from the desert and receive more rainfall and cooler temperatures. These Saharan mountains are home to two distinct ecoregions; the West Saharan montane xeric woodlands in the Ahaggar, Tassili n'Ajjer, Aïr, and other ranges in the western and central Sahara Desert and the Tibesti-Jebel Uweinat montane xeric woodlands in the Tibesti and Jebel Uweinat of the eastern Sahara.

The surface of the desert ranges from large areas of sand dunes (erg), to stone plateaus (hamadas), gravel plains (reg), dry valleys (wadis), and salt flats. The only permanent river that crosses the ecoregion is the Nile River, which originates in east Africa and empties northwards into the Mediterranean Sea. Some areas encompass vast underground aquifers resulting in oases, while other regions severely lack water reserves.

Climate
The Sahara Desert features a hot desert climate (Köppen climate classification BWh). Daily variations may also be extreme: a swing from  has been observed.

More than half of the desert area is hyper-arid and virtually rainless, with an average annual precipitation below  and many consecutive years may pass without any rainfall. The south of the Sahara Desert, along the boundary with the hot semi-arid climate (BSh) of the Sahel, receives most of its annual rainfall during the highest-sun months (summer) when the Inter-Tropical Convergence Zone moves up from the south. Wind- and sandstorms occur in early spring. Local inhabitants protect themselves from the heat, the sunshine, the dry air, the high diurnal temperature ranges and the sometimes dusty or sandy winds by covering their heads, such as the cheche garment worn by Tuareg.

History and conservation

The Sahara was one of the first regions of Africa to be farmed. Some 5,000 years ago, the area was not so arid and the vegetation might have been closer to a savanna. Previous fauna may be recognised in stone carvings. However, desertification set in around 3000 BCE, and the area became much like it is today.

The Sahara is largely undisturbed. The most degradation is found in areas where there is water, such as aquifer oases or along the desert margins where some rain usually falls most years. In these areas, animals such as addaxes, scimitar-horned oryxes, and bustards are over-hunted for their meat. Only one area of conservation is recorded in the Sahara: the Zellaf Nature Reserve in Libya.

Ecoregion delineation
In 2001, WWF devised Terrestrial Ecoregions of the World (TEOW) "a biogeographic regionalization of the Earth's terrestrial biodiversity". The 2001 regionalization divided the deserts of the Sahara into several ecoregions. The Sahara desert ecoregion included the Sahara's hyper-arid center, and the more humid Saharan mountains and southern, northern, eastern, and western deserts were separate ecoregions.

In 2017, the authors of the 2001 system proposed a revised ecoregion system for the Sahara. Two new ecoregions, the West Sahara desert and East Sahara desert, were designated in the hyper-arid center. The transitional North Saharan steppe and woodlands and South Saharan steppe and woodlands ecoregions were extended towards the central Sahara, and the South Saharan steppe and woodlands was renamed South Sahara desert.

References

Deserts and xeric shrublands
Ecoregions of Algeria
Ecoregions of Chad
Ecoregions of Egypt
Ecoregions of Libya
Ecoregions of Mali
Ecoregions of Mauritania
Ecoregions of Niger
Ecoregions of Sudan
 
Sahara
Palearctic ecoregions